Ilie Șerbănescu is a Romanian economist and was the Minister of Reform under Prime Minister Victor Ciorbea.

Biography
Șerbănescu graduated from the Academy of Economic Studies, Bucharest and earned the Doctor of Economics degree in 1978.

He is now a columnist at Bloombiz.

Bibliography
Șerbănescu is the author of

 Corporatiile transnationale (1978)
 Terra, portret in alb-negru (1980)
 Reforma economica in Romania: jumatatile de masura dubleaza costurile sociale (1994
 Manifestul partidului imobilist (1996)

and over 1,500 articles and studies on reform in Romania.

References

Members of the Romanian Cabinet
Romanian economists
Living people
Year of birth missing (living people)